The 1933 Harborough by-election was held on 28 November 1933.  The by-election was held due to the resignation of the incumbent Conservative MP, Arthur Stuart.  It was won by the Conservative candidate Arthur Tree.

References

1933 in England
Harborough District
1933 elections in the United Kingdom
By-elections to the Parliament of the United Kingdom in Leicestershire constituencies
1930s in Leicestershire